The Battle of Port Walthall Junction was fought May 6–7, 1864, between Union and Confederate forces during the Bermuda Hundred Campaign of the American Civil War. Although initially successful, the Confederates were eventually defeated, allowing Union forces to cut a railroad.  The Port Walthall Junction on the Richmond-Petersburg Railroad connected with the spur to Port Walthall.

Battle

In conjunction with the opening of Lt. Gen. Ulysses S. Grant's Overland Campaign, Maj. Gen. Benjamin Butler's Army of the James, 33,000 strong, disembarked from transports at Bermuda Hundred on May 5, threatening the Richmond-Petersburg Railroad. On May 6, Confederate Brig. Gen. Johnson Hagood's brigade stopped initial Federal probes at Port Walthall Junction. On May 7, a Union division drove Hagood's and Brig. Gen. Bushrod Johnson's brigades from the depot and cut the railroad at Port Walthall Junction. Confederate defenders retired behind Swift Run Creek and awaited reinforcements.

Aftermath
Union casualties were more than 300, Confederates fewer than 200, primarily from Hagood's brigade.

Notes

References
National Park Service battle description
CWSAC Report Update
 Salmon, John S. The Official Virginia Civil War Battlefield Guide. Mechanicsburg, PA: Stackpole Books, 2001. .

External links
 Battle animation, Chesterfield Historical Society of Virginia.

Port Walthall Junction
Port Walthall Junction
Port Walthall Junction
Port Walthall Junction
Port Walthall Junction
1864 in Virginia
Chesterfield County, Virginia
May 1864 events